The 2021 Nobel Peace Prize was announced by the Norwegian Nobel Committee in Oslo on 8 October 2021. Maria Ressa (b. 1963) and Dmitry Muratov (b. 1961) received the prize "for their efforts to safeguard freedom of expression, which is a precondition for democracy and lasting peace."

The formal award ceremony was held in Oslo on 10 December 2021, the anniversary of Alfred Nobel's death. In 2020, the ceremony returned to its former venue, the Atrium of the University of Oslo Faculty of Law, after being held in Oslo City Hall during the period 1990–2019. In 2021, the ceremony returned to Oslo City Hall.

There were 329 candidates for the prize when nominations closed on 31 January 2021. The Norwegian News Agency reported earlier in 2021 that Maria Ressa had been nominated by Jonas Gahr Støre, the designated Prime Minister following the 2021 election, and many sources in Russia claim that Dmitry Muratov was nominated by Mikhail Gorbachev.

Nomination process
Different groups of qualified nominators may nominate candidates, including members of national assemblies and national governments, heads of state, judges of certain international courts, (full) professor-level academics in relevant fields, and former laureates; a significant proportion of the nominations are submitted by Norwegian MPs and academics. Nominations are submitted to the Oslo-based Norwegian Nobel Committee, usually in a Scandinavian language (Norwegian, Swedish, Danish) or English. Nominations for the 2021 prize opened on 1 September 2020 and closed on 31 January 2021 (Norwegian time).

Candidates
There are 329 candidates in 2021, 234 individuals and 95 organizations. The Nobel Foundation is not allowed to publish nominations for at least 50 years. Individual nominators can, and sometimes do, choose to publish their nomination, and Norwegian media often report nominations by qualified nominators such as members of parliament and qualified academics.

The Norwegian News Agency reported on 31 January 2021 that the 2021 nominees confirmed by qualified Norwegian nominators (MPs or academics) before the deadline included the following candidates:

Notes

Laureates

On 8 October 2021, the Norwegian Nobel Committee announced its decision to award the prize to journalists Maria Ressa and Dmitry Muratov "for their efforts to safeguard freedom of expression, which is a precondition for democracy and lasting peace." As a result, the Nobel Prize Committee was criticized for rewarding Muratov and not jailed Russian opposition leader Alexei Navalny, as an attempt by the Committee "to keep the maximum distance from the current political process" in Russia. Muratov has said that he would have given the prize to Alexei Navalny if it were his choice. The U.S. government assessed that Russian intelligence was behind an attack on Dmitry Muratov for criticizing the Kremlin’s war against Ukraine.

Prize committee
The members of the Norwegian Nobel Committee are elected by the Norwegian Parliament and are responsible for selecting the laureate in accordance with the will of Alfred Nobel; the committee's members in 2021 are:
 Berit Reiss-Andersen (chair, born 1954), advocate (barrister) and former President of the Norwegian Bar Association, former state secretary for the Minister of Justice and the Police (representing the Labour Party). Member of the Norwegian Nobel Committee since 2012, reappointed for the period 2018–2023.
 Asle Toje (vice chair, born 1974), foreign policy scholar. Appointed for the period 2018–2023.
 Anne Enger (born 1949), former Leader of the Centre Party and Minister of Culture. Member since 2018, reappointed for the period 2021–2026.
 Kristin Clemet (born 1957), former Minister of Government Administration and Labour and Minister of Education and Research. Appointed for the period 2021–2026.
 Jørgen Watne Frydnes (born 1984), former board member of Médecins Sans Frontières Norway, board member of the Norwegian Helsinki Committee. Appointed for the period 2021–2026.

Prize ceremony

The award ceremony was held in Oslo on 10 December 2021, the anniversary of Alfred Nobel's death. In 2020 the ceremony returned to its former venue, the Atrium of the University of Oslo Faculty of Law, after being held in Oslo City Hall during the period 1990–2019. In 2021 the ceremony was once again held in Oslo City Hall.

References 

2021
Nobel Peace Prize